Warren Scott Sharples (born March 1, 1968, Montreal, Quebec) is a retired Canadian professional ice hockey goaltender.

Playing career
Sharples played junior hockey for the Penticton Knights of the BCJHL during the 1985-86 season when the Knights were crowned Centennial Cup Champions.  He then played college hockey at the University of Michigan for the Wolverines, earning team MVP honours and top student athlete twice. After turning professional, he played for the Calgary Flames in the NHL, the Salt Lake Golden Eagles in the IHL, the St. John's Maple Leafs in the AHL, and the Brantford Smoke in the Colonial Hockey League. He appeared in only one NHL game, recording 36 saves in a 4–4 tie against the Vancouver Canucks.

See also
List of players who played only one game in the NHL

References

External links
 

1968 births
Living people
Anglophone Quebec people
Brantford Smoke players
Calgary Flames draft picks
Calgary Flames players
Canadian expatriate ice hockey players in the United States
Canadian ice hockey goaltenders
Ice hockey people from Montreal
Michigan Wolverines men's ice hockey players
St. John's Maple Leafs players
Salt Lake Golden Eagles (IHL) players